World-class ski resorts located in the Southwestern state of New Mexico includes the southernmost major ski resort in the United States, as well as the longest aerial tramway in the Americas.  The following table is comparison of their various sizes, runs, lifts, and snowfall:

See also
 Comparison of California ski resorts
 Comparison of Colorado ski resorts
 Comparison of North American ski resorts
 List of ski areas and resorts in the United States

References

External links 
 Ski New Mexico

Sports in New Mexico
Ski areas and resorts in New Mexico
Lists of ski areas and resorts